Idrisi may refer to:

Muhammad al-Idrisi, 12th-century explorer, geographer and writer
Idris I of Libya, 20th-century Libyan king
IDRISI, a GIS computer program
İdrisqışlaq, Azerbaijan
Idrisis of Asir, the former ruling family]] of the Emirate of Asir